"The Man That Turned My Mama On" is a song written by Ed Bruce, and recorded by American country music artist Tanya Tucker.  It was released in June 1974 as the second single from the album Would You Lay with Me (In a Field of Stone).  The song reached #4 on the Billboard Hot Country Singles & Tracks chart.

Content
The song speaks of the narrator's wish that she could have known more about her father, a traveling salesman who met her mother and quickly married her (the lyrics indicate that the quick marriage was more of an elopement than a shotgun marriage, since "Grandma Kate" – the narrator's grandmother who raised her mother to be a proper lady – likely would not have approved of the relationship).

Unlike other songs where the father is absent due to abandonment, in this song the father died of illness when she was only five.

Chart performance

Other versions
Songwriter Ed Bruce recorded the song for his own 1978 album "Cowboys and Dreamers"; released as a single, it made number 70 on the country charts.

References

Songs about mothers
1974 singles
Tanya Tucker songs
Songs written by Ed Bruce
Song recordings produced by Billy Sherrill
Ed Bruce songs
Columbia Records singles
1974 songs